Jason Thomas (born ) is a United States Marine who located and rescued people in the aftermath of collapse of the World Trade Center in New York City after the September 11 attacks in 2001. With fellow U.S. Marine David Karnes, he helped find a pair of Port Authority Police officers buried in the rubble of the World Trade Center.

Career

2001: September 11 attacks
On September 11, 2001, Thomas was dropping his daughter off at the home of his mother on Long Island when she told him planes had struck the towers. The 27-year-old Thomas, having left active duty in August 2001, quickly put on his Marine uniform (camouflage utilities), sped to Manhattan, and had just parked his car when the North Tower of the World Trade Center collapsed.

Thomas told the Associated Press:

Thomas ran into another Marine veteran, Staff Sgt. David Karnes. Thomas presented a plan for a search-and-rescue mission of the area, and he and Karnes tried to enlist other marines and soldiers on site to help. When they were told the mission was too dangerous, they decided to go by themselves. "I found a couple guys, but it wasn't enough, to them, to start a search and rescue," he said. "I remember myself and Karnes saying, 'We're going to start the search and rescue with or without you, because someone needs us.'"

Carrying an infantryman's shovel, the two climbed the debris, calling out, "Is anyone down there? United States Marines!"  They met an operating engineer, who had a flashlight, and crawled down into the hole where the 2 police officers were trapped. The engineer climbed out, and brought back two Port Authority Police Department officers.

Thomas said he returned to Ground Zero every day to pitch in, before attempting to put the events behind him. He did not even tell his five children about his rescues. He had identified himself to Karnes and others only as "Sergeant Thomas".

Thomas is now serving in the United States Air Force as a medical technician since 2006.

Thomas was portrayed in Oliver Stone's feature film World Trade Center by William Mapother. This portrayal by a white actor generated controversy, and the producers stated that they were unaware that the real Thomas was black until they had already started filming.

On February 11, 2007, Extreme Makeover: Home Edition aired a special two-hour episode about Thomas and his family. Following the attacks, Thomas and his wife had moved their four children from New York to Whitehall, Ohio. The house they bought began to deteriorate and the show intervened to help them.

On September 2, 2013, Channel 4 detailed Thomas' involvement in the rescue operation following the collapse of the towers in the UK broadcast The Lost Hero of 9/11.

After 9/11
As of 2018, Thomas was living in Whitehall, Ohio with his wife Kirsti and their children. He works as an officer for the Ohio Supreme Court as well as being a Technical Sergeant in the United States Air Force.

References

External links

Heroes Helping Humanity, The non-profit organization founded by Jason Thomas 

1974 births
Living people
People associated with the September 11 attacks
United States Marines
African-American United States Navy personnel
United States Marine Corps personnel of the War in Afghanistan (2001–2021)
United States Marine Corps personnel of the Iraq War
United States Air Force airmen
African-American United States Air Force personnel